Américo de Campos is a Brazilian municipality of the state of São Paulo.

References

Municipalities in São Paulo (state)